Baeoptila is a genus of moths of the family Crambidae.

Species
Baeoptila leptorrhoda (Turner, 1908)
Baeoptila oculalis (Hampson, 1897)
Baeoptila selenias Turner, 1908

References

Musotiminae
Crambidae genera
Taxa named by Alfred Jefferis Turner